Musino (Musa) is a rural locality (a village) in Novopetrovsky Selsoviet, Kugarchinsky District, Bashkortostan, Russia. The population was 103 as of 2010. There are 2 streets.

Geography 
Musino is located 14 km southwest of Mrakovo (the district's administrative centre) by road. Starokhvalynsky is the nearest rural locality.

References 

Rural localities in Kugarchinsky District